We Were Seven Sisters is a 1939 Italian "white-telephones" romantic comedy film directed by Nunzio Malasomma and starring Antonio Gandusio.

Cast
 Antonio Gandusio as Il conte Leone Varani
 Nino Besozzi as Leonardo Varani
 Sergio Tofano as Antonio, il maggiordomo
 Pina Renzi as Amalia, la madre per finzione
 Paola Barbara as Lisa
 Niní Gordini Cervi as Olga
 Lotte Menas as Eleonora
 Anna Maria Dossena as Marcella
 Olivia Fried as Norina
 Elena Altieri as Tina
 Guglielmo Sinaz as Fachinetti, il impresario
 Guglielmo Barnabò as Il barone Franzetti

References

External links

1939 films
1939 romantic comedy films
1930s Italian-language films
Italian black-and-white films
Films directed by Nunzio Malasomma
Italian romantic comedy films
1930s Italian films